Klubi i Futbollit KF Valbona commonly known as KF Valbona, or simply as Valbona, is a professional football club based in Bajram Curri, Albania. Refounded in 1960 as KF Valbona Football Club, the team has traditionally worn a blue home kit since. The team is competing in Kategoria e Dytë.

Current squad

References

Football clubs in Albania
Association football clubs established in 2013
2013 establishments in Albania
Tropojë
Albanian Third Division clubs